The 2017 Troy Trojans football team represented Troy University in the 2017 NCAA Division I FBS football season. The Trojans played their home games at Veterans Memorial Stadium in Troy, Alabama, and competed in the Sun Belt Conference. They were led by third-year head coach Neal Brown. They finished the season 11–2, 7–1 in Sun Belt play to finish in a tie for the Sun Belt championship. They received an invitation to the New Orleans Bowl where they defeated North Texas.

Previous season 
The Trojans finished the 2016 season 10–3, 6–2 in Sun Belt play to finish in a tie for third place. They were invited to the Dollar General Bowl where they defeated Ohio. The season marked the first 10-win season for Troy since joining the FBS in 2001. It was also the first time that Troy had received a Top 25 ranking since.

Schedule
Troy announced its 2017 football schedule on March 1, 2017. The 2017 schedule consisted of six home and away games in the regular season. The Trojans hosted Sun Belt foes Georgia Southern, Idaho, South Alabama, and Texas State, and traveled to Arkansas State, Coastal Carolina, Georgia State, and New Mexico State.

The Trojans hosted two of their four non-conference opponents, Akron from the Mid-American Conference and Alabama State from the Southwestern Athletic Conference, and will travel to Boise State from the Mountain West Conference and LSU from the Southeastern Conference.

Game summaries

at Boise State

Alabama State

at New Mexico State

Akron

at LSU

Troy beat LSU securing their first win against an AP TOP 25 team.

South Alabama

at Georgia State

Georgia Southern

Idaho

at Coastal Carolina

Texas State

at Arkansas State

vs North Texas–New Orleans Bowl

References

Troy
Troy Trojans football seasons
Sun Belt Conference football champion seasons
New Orleans Bowl champion seasons
Troy Trojans football